Events from the year 1976 in Michigan.

The Associated Press (AP) selected the top Michigan news stories of 1976 as follows:
 United Auto Workers strikes against Ford Motor Company lasting 28 days (from September 14 to October 12) and General Motors lasting 12 hours (from midnight until noon on November 19);
 A forest fire lasting for two months from July until September that blackened 65,000 acres in the Seney National Wildlife Refuge in the Upper Peninsula with state and federal firefighting costs reaching $7.5 million;
 Continued fallout from the Michigan PBB contamination incident in which a flame retardant chemical (PBB) was mixed with livestock feed, distributed to Michigan farms, and fed to 1.5 million chickens, 30,000 cattle, 5,900 pigs, and 1,470 sheep;
 Voter approval on November 2 of a ballot proposal banning throwaway beverage containers;
 Gerald Ford's November 2 loss to Jimmy Carter in the 1976 U.S. Presidential election, though Ford took Michigan's 21 electoral votes with 51.8% of the state's votes to 46.4% for Carter;
 A March 3 ice storm that left 200,000 homes in southern Michigan without power and caused millions of dollars in damage;
 Congressman Donald Riegle's election to replace retiring U.S. Senator Philip Hart after defeating Secretary of State Richard H. Austin and Congressman James G. O'Hara in the Democratic primary on August 3 and Marvin Esch in the general election on November 2;
 A violent melee on August 15 that erupted following a concert at Cobo Hall featuring Average White Band and Kool & the Gang with multiple robberies and beatings and two gang rapes;
 The prosecution of two Filipina nurses, Filipina Narciso and Leonora Perez, in the Ann Arbor Hospital Murders in which 10 patients at the Veterans Hospital in Ann Arbor died mysteriously from respiratory failure; and
 The state's fiscal year is extended by three months to avoid a deficit.

The AP also selected the state's top sports stories as follows:

 The success of rookie pitcher Mark Fidrych who won 19 games for the Detroit Tigers, was the starting pitcher for the American League in the All-Star Game, led the American League with a 2.34 earned run average, and was named American League Rookie of the Year;
 The NCAA's imposition of three years of probation against the Michigan State Spartans football team for illegal recruiting and the firing of head coach Denny Stolz and athletic director Burt Smith;
 The 1976 Michigan Wolverines football team that compiled a compiled a 10–1 record in the regular season and was ranked No. 1 before being upset by Purdue;
 The 1975–76 Michigan Wolverines men's basketball team that compiled a 25–7 record and advanced to the Final Four, losing to Indiana in the championship game;
 Ron LeFlore compiling a 30-game hitting streak, the longest in the American League in 27 years, and stealing 56 bases for the Detroit Tigers;
 Detroit speedskater Sheila Young winning gold, silver and bronze medals at the 1976 Winter Olympics in Innsbruck, Austria;
 Rick Forzano's resignation as head coach of the Detroit Lions on October 4, the hiring of Tommy Hudspeth as head coach on October 5, and the team compiling a 6–8 record;
 The 1975-76 Western Michigan Broncos men's basketball team compiling a 25–3 record and advancing to the Sweet 16 round of the 1976 NCAA Division I Basketball Tournament before narrowly losing to No. 2 ranked Marquette;
 The Detroit Pistons selection of Marvin Barnes on August 5 with the fourth overall pick in the ABA dispersal draft; and
 Bo Schembechler undergoing open heart surgery to perform four bypasses on May 20 and deciding to continue coaching.

Office holders

State office holders

 Governor of Michigan: William Milliken (Republican) 
 Lieutenant Governor of Michigan: James Damman (Republican) 
 Michigan Attorney General: Frank J. Kelley (Democrat)
 Michigan Secretary of State: Richard H. Austin (Democrat)
 Speaker of the Michigan House of Representatives: Bobby Crim (Democrat)
 Majority Leader of the Michigan Senate: William B. Fitzgerald, Jr. (Democrat)/William Faust (Democrat)
 Chief Justice, Michigan Supreme Court:

Mayors of major cities
 Mayor of Detroit: Coleman Young
 Mayor of Grand Rapids: Lyman Parks/Abe L. Drasin
 Mayor of Flint: James W. Rutherford
 Mayor of Lansing: Gerald W. Graves
 Mayor of Ann Arbor: Albert Wheeler (Democrat)

Federal office holders
 United States Senator from Michigan: Philip Hart (Democrat)
 United States Senator from Michigan: Robert P. Griffin (Republican) 
 United States Representative, District 1: John Conyers (Democrat)
 United States Representative, District 2: Marvin L. Esch (Republican)
 United States Representative, District 3: Garry E. Brown (Republican)
 United States Representative, District 4: J. Edward Hutchinson (Republican)
 United States Representative, District 5: Richard Vander Veen (Democrat)
 United States Representative, District 6: Bob Carr (Democrat)
 United States Representative, District 7: Donald W. Riegle Jr. (Democrat)
 United States Representative, District 8: J. Bob Traxler (Democrat)
 United States Representative, District 9: Guy Vander Jagt (Republican)
 United States Representative, District 10: Elford Albin Cederberg (Republican)
 United States Representative, District 11: Philip Ruppe (Republican)
 United States Representative, District 12: James G. O'Hara (Democrat)
 United States Representative, District 13: Charles Diggs (Democrat)
 United States Representative, District 14: Lucien N. Nedzi (Democrat)
 United States Representative, District 15: William D. Ford (Democrat)
 United States Representative, District 16: John Dingell (Democrat)
 United States Representative, District 17: William M. Brodhead (Democrat)
 United States Representative, District 18: James Blanchard (Democrat)
 United States Representative, District 19: William Broomfield (Republican)

Population

Sports

Baseball
 1976 Detroit Tigers season – Under manager Ralph Houk, the Tigers compiled a 74–87 record and finished fifth in the American League East. The team's statistical leaders included Ron LeFlore with a .316 batting average, Jason Thompson with 17 home runs, Rusty Staub with 96 RBIs, and Mark Fidrych with 19 wins and a 2.34 earned run average (ERA). Fidrych led the American League in ERA and was selected as the American League Rookie of the Year and as the top sports story in Michigan in 1976.  LeFlore had a 36-game hitting streak, the longest by a Tiger in 33 years, and stole 56 bases, the most by a Tiger in 60 years.
 1976 Michigan Wolverines baseball team - Under head coach Moby Benedict, the Wolverines compiled a 22–20–1 record and won the Big Ten Conference championship. Pitcher Lary Sorensen and Mark Weber were selected as the team's most valuable players. Second baseman Dick Walterhouse was the team captain. Rick Leach led the team with a .345 batting average.

American football
 1976 Detroit Lions season – The Lions, under head coaches Rick Forzano and Tommy Hudspeth, compiled a 6–8 record and finished in third place in the NFL's Central Division. The team's statistical leaders included Greg Landry with 2,191 passing yards, Dexter Bussey with 858 rushing yards, Ray Jarvis with 822 receiving yards, and Benny Ricardo with 49 points scored.
 1976 Michigan Wolverines football team – Under head coach Bo Schembechler, the Wolverines compiled a 10–1 record in the regular season and lost to USC in the 1977 Rose Bowl. The Wolverines were ranked No. 3 in the final AP Poll. The team's statistical leaders included Rick Leach with 973 passing yards, Rob Lytle with 1,469 rushing yards and 96 points scored, and Jim Smith with 714 receiving yards.
 1976 Michigan State Spartans football team –  Under head coach Darryl Rogers, the Spartans compiled a 4–6–1 record. The team's statistical leaders included Ed Smith with 1,749 passing yards, Richard Baes with 931 rushing yards, and Kirk Gibson with 748 receiving yards.
 1976 Central Michigan Chippewas football team – Under head coach Roy Kramer, the Chippewas compiled a 7–4 record. 
 1976 Eastern Michigan Hurons football team – Under head coach Ed Chlebek, the Hurons compiled a 2–9 record.
 1976 Western Michigan Broncos football team – Under head coach Elliot Uzelac, the Broncos compiled a 7–4 record.

Basketball
 1975–76 Detroit Pistons season – Under head coaches Ray Scott and Herb Brown, the Pistons compiled a 34–46 record and finished second in the NBA's Midwest Division. The team's statistical leaders included Bob Lanier with 1,366 points and 746 rebounds and Eric Money with 338 assists.
 1975–76 Michigan Wolverines men's basketball team – Under head coach Johnny Orr, the Wolverines compiled a 25–7 record, advanced to the Final Four in the 1976 NCAA Division I Basketball Tournament, losing to Indiana in the title game. The team's statistical leaders included Rickey Green with 638 points and 132 assists and Phil Hubbard with 352 rebounds.
 1975–76 Western Michigan Broncos men's basketball team – Under head coach Eldon Miller, the Broncos compiled a 25–3 record, won the Mid-American Conference championship, and advanced to the Sweet 16 round of the 1976 NCAA Division I Basketball Tournament.
 1975–76 Detroit Titans men's basketball team – The Titans compiled a 19–8 record under head coach Dick Vitale. The team's statistical leaders included John Long with 532 points and Terry Tyler with 298 rebounds.
 1975–76 Michigan State Spartans men's basketball team – Under head coach Gus Ganakas, the Spartans compiled a 14–13 record and finished fourth in the Big Ten Conference. The team's statistical leaders included Terry Furlow with 793 points and Greg Kelser with 260 rebounds.

Ice hockey
 1975–76 Detroit Red Wings season –  Under head coaches Doug Barkley and Alex Delvecchio, the Red Wings compiled a 26–44–10 record and finished fourth in the National Hockey League's Norris Division. The team's statistical leaders included Michel Bergeron with 32 goals and Walt McKechnie with 56 assists and 82 points. The team's regular goaltenders were Jim Rutherford and Eddie Giacomin.
 1975–76 Michigan Tech Huskies men's ice hockey team – Under head coach John MacInnes, Michigan Tech compiled a 34–9 record and finished second in the 1976 NCAA Division I Men's Ice Hockey Tournament, losing to Minnesota in the title game.
 1975–76 Michigan State Spartans men's ice hockey team – Under head coach Amo Bessone, the Spartans compiled a 23–15–2 record.
 1975–76 Michigan Wolverines men's ice hockey season – Under head coach Dan Farrell, the Wolverines compiled a 21–18 record.
 Great Lakes Invitational -

Other

Music
Albums and singles by Michigan artists or centered on Michigan topics that were released or became hits in 1976 include the following:
 "Love Machine" by The Miracles was released in October 1975 and was ranked as the No. 7 hit on the Billboard Year-End Hot 100 singles of 1976.
 "Theme from Mahogany (Do You Know Where You're Going To)" by Diana Ross was released in September 1975 and was ranked as the No. 43 hit on the Billboard Year-End Hot 100 singles of 1976.
 Born to Die by Grand Funk Railroad was released in January 1976.
 Diana Ross by Diana Ross was released on February 10, 1976. It included the song "Love Hangover" which was ranked as the No. 15 hit on the Billboard Year-End Hot 100 singles of 1976.
 Live Bullet by Bob Seger & The Silver Bullet Band was released on April 12, 1976. It was recorded live at Cobo Hall in Detroit.
 Alice Cooper Goes to Hell by Alice Cooper was released on June 25, 1976.
 "Detroit Rock City" by Kiss was released on July 28, 1976.
 "The Wreck of the Edmund Fitzgerald" by Gordon Lightfoot was released in August 1976. It reached No. 2 on the Billboard Hot 100. 
 Songs in the Key of Life by Stevie Wonder was released on September 28, 1976. It included the songs Sir Duke, Isn't She Lovely, and As. In 2003, it was ranked No. 57 on Rolling Stone's 500 Greatest Albums of All Time.
 Night Moves by Bob Seger & The Silver Bullet Band was released on October 22, 1976. It was certified platinum and featured the songs, "Night Moves", "Mainstreet", "Rock and Roll Never Forgets", "The Fire Down Below", and "Mary Lou".
 Free-for-All by Ted Nugent was released in October 1976 and was certified platinum.

Chronology of events

January

February

March

April

May

June

July

August

September

October

November

December

Births
 January 28 - Jon Jansen, NFL offensive lineman (1998-2009), in Clawson, Michigan
 April 27 - Blaze Ya Dead Homie, rapper, in Mt. Clemens, Michigan
 July 28 - Huma Abedin, political staffer who was vice chair of Hillary Clinton's 2016 campaign for President, in Kalamazoo, Michigan

Gallery of 1976 births

Deaths
 February 22 - Florence Ballard, founding member of The Supremes, of a heart attack at age 32 in Detroit
 March 10 - Haddon Sundblom, artist from Muskegon known for his images of Santa Claus created for The Coca-Cola Company, at age 76
 April 2 - Ray Teal, actor from Grand Rapids (Sheriff Roy Coffee on Bonanza), at age 74 in Santa Monica, California
 April - Myra Wolfgang, labor leader and women's rights activist, at age 61 in Detroit
 May 20 - Syd Howe, left wing for Detroit Red Wings (1934-1946) and member of the Hockey Hall of Fame, at age 64 in Ottawa, Ontario
 June 15 - Jimmy Dykes, Major League Baseball player (1918-1939), manager of Detroit Tigers (1959-1960), at age 79 in Philadelphia
 June 23 - DeHart Hubbard, the first black athlete to win a gold medal at the Olympics (long jump, 1924), at age 73 in Cleveland
 August 31 - Frederick H. Mueller, United States Secretary of Commerce (1959-1961), at age 82 in Grand Rapids, Michigan
 December 4 - Ace Gutowsky, NFL fullback (1932-1939) who held Detroit Lions career and single-season rushing records until the 1960s, at age 67 in Kingfisher, Oklahoma
 December 13 - Victor A. Knox, Congressman from Michigan's 11th District (1953-1965), at age 77 in Petoskey, Michigan
 December 26 - Philip Hart, U.S. Senator (1959-1976), from cancer at age 64 in Washington, D.C.

Gallery of 1976 deaths

References